To Our Children's Children's Children is the fifth album by the Moody Blues, released in November 1969.

"Watching and Waiting" was released as a single to promote the album, but sold poorly.  On the other hand, "Gypsy (Of a Strange and Distant Time)" became a fan and album oriented rock radio favourite, despite never being released as a single, and remained in the band's concert setlist through the 1970s.

Background
The album was the first released on the group's newly formed Threshold record label, which was named after the band's previous album from the same year, On the Threshold of a Dream. It was inspired by the 1969 moon landing. In the opening track, "Higher and Higher", sound effects of a rocket launching begin the song and last for the first minute.

Release
While the extracted single, "Watching and Waiting," did not do well in that market, To Our Children's Children's Children was critically well-received and sold well, reaching number 2 in the UK albums chart and number 14 in the US. The album was mixed and released in both stereo and quadraphonic.

The album was one of those listened to, on cassette tape, by the crew of Apollo 15 in 1971.

Track listing

Personnel
Justin Hayward – vocals, guitars, sitar
John Lodge – vocals, bass guitar, harp, acoustic guitar
Ray Thomas – vocals, flute, tambourine, bass flute, oboe
Graeme Edge – drums, percussion
Mike Pinder – vocals, Mellotron, piano, EMS VCS 3, Hammond organ, acoustic guitar, celesta, double bass

Charts

Certifications

References

External links

The Moody Blues albums
1969 albums
Albums produced by Tony Clarke (record producer)
Threshold Records albums
Science fiction concept albums